In response to a growing rise of digital and interactive media as well as the gradual decline of dolls, toys and accessories in the 1980s, American toy and entertainment company Mattel partnered with animation studios to produce CGI or computer-animated feature films featuring its flagship Barbie fashion doll asset.

These films were broadcast on Nickelodeon in the United States from 2002 until 2017. They were also released on home video formats, predominantly by Universal Pictures Home Entertainment, until 2017. From 2012 until date, Mattel expanded the franchise beyond just the films to other audiovisual media such as web series, television shows and streaming television content, with the latter following a growing rise and trend in streaming services and online platforms. In 2020, Mattel revamped the films into streaming television films, brand them as animated "specials" and revolve them around the canon of the streaming television series, Barbie: Dreamhouse Adventures. Additionally, a live-action adaptation of the toyline is currently awaiting its American theatrical release on 21 July 2023 by Warner Bros. following production wrap-up from Mattel Films with the association of LuckyChap Entertainment and Heyday Films.

Adaptations and Plot Tests (2001–2009)
Mattel launched its eponymous in-house entertainment division in 2001 and began the Barbie film series by adapting pre-existing stories/tales and seeking animation co-production with Canadian studio, Mainframe Studios. Elise Allen introduced original storylines to the series through screenwriting the main entries of the Barbie: Fairytopia franchise. In between their co-productions, American studio Curious Pictures pitched in by animating The Barbie Diaries (2006).

In 2007, Mainframe, at the time known as Mainframe Entertainment, got acquired by a local then-upcoming firm, "Rainmaker Income Fund", from which they would adopt the initial name of Rainmaker Animation and the permanent name of Rainmaker Entertainment the following year. The films were originally distributed on VHS and DVD by Artisan Entertainment and Family Home Entertainment from 2001 until 2004 when both were acquired by and folded into Lionsgate. In 2006, Mattel ceased distribution of the films on VHS and focus solely on DVD whiles Universal takes over the original distribution rights, which would include the back catalog/pre-2006 catalog a decade later.

Barbie in the Nutcracker (2001)
Based on The Nutcracker and the Mouse King by E. T. A. Hoffmann and The Nutcracker ballet music by Pyotr Illych Tchaikovsky, this inaugural film in the series stars Barbie narrating a story to her younger sister, Kelly, a story about a young girl named Clara who gets a beautiful wooden nutcracker from her aunt Elizabeth as a Christmas gift. Later that night, the toy comes alive to protect Clara from the evil Mouse King's soldiers. Clara gets shrunk to toy size and along with her brave Nutcracker goes in search of a magical Sugarplum Princess to reverse a spell. In the midst of the adventure is the live nutcracker toy dancing with Clara at two intervals in the film.

Barbie as Rapunzel (2002)
This 2nd entry based on the classic tale by the Brothers Grimm stars Barbie as Rapunzel, who is trapped in a tall tower by an evil witch. Hidden from the outside world, Rapunzel spends much of her day painting and dreaming of a happier life. After many years alone Rapunzel goes on a journey with her friends Penelope and Hobie to find her happily ever after.

Barbie of Swan Lake (2003)
The 2nd ballet Barbie film in the franchise. Based on the Swan Lake ballet music by Tchaikovsky, this 3rd film revolves around Barbie playing Odette, a young daughter of a baker, who one day follows a unicorn by name Lila into an enchanted forest. Odette gets turned into a swan by a wicked wizard who is trying to overthrow the Fairy Queen. She goes to save the Enchanted Forest.

Barbie as the Princess and the Pauper (2004)
Based on the Mark Twain classic tale and the first musical film in the series, this 4th film stars Barbie as the dual role of blonde Princess Anneliese and brunette commoner Erika, who go along a journey towards a lifelong friendship. The two soon discover the Queen's advisor, Preminger, has evil plans to take endless power for himself. Only Erika knows how to help her.

Following the original release of this film, Lionsgate would acquire Artisan Entertainment and Family Home Entertainment and thus in the process take over the original distribution rights to/of the films.

Barbie: Fairytopia (2005)
The 5th entry and the first ever original film in the series stars Barbie as a wingless fairy named Elina who lives in a flower named Peony in a magical meadow with her puffball best friend, Bibble. Many of Elina's winged friends lose their flying abilities and become weak due to a green-colored potion spread throughout the meadow by firebirds sent by an evil fairy named Laverna. Elina sets off to save her meadow and her friends by tracking down Azura, one of 7 Guardian Fairies.

This film was released in the spring, breaking the one-film-per-year autumn/fall release cycle of the previous films.

Barbie and the Magic of Pegasus (2005)
This 6th film entry and the 2nd original film in the series stars Barbie as a talented ice skater named Princess Annika. When her family and village are attacked by the evil Wenlock, she embarks on a journey along with a hunter she encounters to Cloud Kingdom on the back of her flying pegasus, Brietta, who is the cursed older sister of Annika. Together, they uncover family secrets and make a plan to defeat Wenlock to save their people.

Barbie Fairytopia: Mermaidia/Barbie: Mermaidia (2006)
The 7th entry and the final Barbie film to be originally released on VHS follows on from Barbie: Fairytopia where Barbie's character in the film, Elina, was rewarded for her bravery to battle Laverna with her own new pair of wings. She is unexpectedly thrust into battle with Laverna again, this time through her fungi minions who have kidnapped the mer-prince Nalu. Laverna gave the leader of the fungi, Fungus Maximus, a vile potion to threaten pollution to the sea and all aquatic life unless Nalu gives them the secret location of a magical Immunity Berry, which would make whoever eats it immune to all magic regardless of time. Elina needs the help of a mermaid Nori, who does not trust her. Working together, Elina and Nori save Nalu and find the Immunity Berry.

Following the original release of this film, Mattel ceased future Barbie film releases on VHS, as the format was gradually deprecating and depreciating in worldwide popularity at the time.

The Barbie Diaries (2006)
This 8th entry is the first to solely be originally released on DVD, the last Barbie film to be originally distributed by Lionsgate and the only Barbie film produced by Curious Pictures. This film stars Barbie in her inaugural standalone character and her best friends Tia, Courtney and Kevin as sophomores in high school. The four stick together as they face high school challenges whiles making music under their band name "Charmz". Barbie strives to land her dream job at the school's TV station but has to battle the school's most popular girl, Raquelle, and juggle her boy crush feelings, both with the school's top jock, Todd, and her own male best friend, Kevin, at the same time.  Barbie begins to lean on a magic diary given to her by a kind and fun-to-be-with sales girl named Stephanie to help strengthen her confidence and go for her dreams.

Barbie in the 12 Dancing Princesses (2006)
Based on the eponymous tale by the Brothers Grimm, the 9th entry, the 3rd ballet film, and the first Barbie film to be originally distributed by Universal tells the story of a widowed King Randolph and his 12 daughters, including the most outgoing of them all, Princess Genevieve, played by Barbie. To ensure his daughters grow up to learn to behave like proper ladies, the King enlists his less fortunate cousin, Duchess Rowena, to teach the girls about royal etiquette. Little does he know that the Duchess wants to end his life and take over the kingdom for herself. In the midst of the plot, there are 4 dance scenes at different intervals of the film.

Barbie Fairytopia: Magic of the Rainbow (2007)
The 10th entry and the final part of the Barbie: Fairytopia trilogy follows Elina to fairy school where she learns fairy magic and dancing. Once again, Laverna comes up with an evil plan to stop the fairies from performing their annual rainbow dance. Elina and her classmates have to learn to set their differences aside and unite to stop Laverna once and for all.

This film is the last to be produced by Mainframe under the Mainframe Entertainment name.

Barbie as the Island Princess (2007)
This 11th film entry, the second musical film in the series and the only film to be produced by Mainframe Studios under the Rainmaker Animation name following the Rainmaker Income Fund acquisition stars Barbie as a shipwrecked young girl named Rosella who lands and grows up on an island along with its inhabitant anthropomorphic animals. One day, a prince named Antonio and his right-hand man, Fraser, arrives on the island and meets Rosella, who was at first known as simply Ro, and her pet friends to explore civilization. Together, they discover a plot to recover Ro’s kingdom and do what they can to try and save the day.

Barbie: Mariposa (2008)
Alternatively titled Barbie Fairytopia: Mariposa and Barbie: Mairypoa & Her Butterfly Fairy Friends, this 12th film entry in the series is the first of 2 spin-offs of the Barbie: Fairytopia trilogy-turned-franchise and the first to be produced by Mainframe Studios under the Rainmaker Entertainment name.

In this film, Elina narrates a story about a fairy named Mariposa and her friends, Rayna and Rayla, living in a distant kingdom in Fairytopia known as Flutterfield which is protected by its magical lights put in place by its ruler, Queen Marabella. Facing internal tension with the Queen's own attendant, Lord Gastrous, and her son, Prince Carlos, Henna wants the power of the Queen and tries to take over the kingdom for herself. Mariposa and her friends take it upon themselves to venture into enemy territory to find an antidote for their beloved Queen.

Barbie & the Diamond Castle (2008)
This 13th film entry and the 3rd musical film stars Barbie and her best friend Teresa sharing their love of music. It is the first film to feature Stacy, replacing Kelly, who originally was told stories by Barbie. The two friends star as Liana and Alexa, two girls who live in a cottage with big dreams. After finding a muse trapped in a mirror, they both embark on a journey to restore the Diamond Castle, before Lydia, a witch who has betrayed the muses takes the castle for herself.

This film stars Teresa, a side character for the first time in a mainstream Barbie production.

Barbie in A Christmas Carol (2008)
Based on the 1844 story/tale by Charles Dickens, this 14th film entry about the meaning of Christmas and helping those who are less fortunate, stars Barbie and her younger sister, Kelly, who would rather stay at home on Christmas instead of attending the hospital's annual charity ball. Barbie tells her a story of an opera singer named Eden Starling with a similar point of view about not only her hatred for opera, but like Kelly, the Christmas culture. Her best friend, Catherine Dingerfield, and close strangers helping to put up decorations for the Christmas festivities grow more disconsolate about her behaviour. They begin distance themselves from her or even plan with or invite her to any holiday event.

But her behaviors and perception about Christmas would all change for the following 3 nights as she is visited by 3 Christmas spirits; each one coming in one night after another, showing her Christmas Past, the Christmas Present, and the Christmas Future. Eden only then discovers the true meaning of Christmas.

This film would feature the final appearance of Barbie's younger sister under the name Kelly as Mattel would change her name to Chelsea in 2011 prior to Barbie: Life in the Dreamhouse. This would also be the final film scripted by Elana Lesser and Clifford "Cliff" Ruby, who scrpited the inaugural film entry with former Mattel executive producer, Rob Hudnut, and were responsible for scripting most of the story adaptations in the films since its 2001 debut. Nikki is also introduced for the first time in the Barbie Film Series, and is the 2nd side character to appear.

Barbie Presents Thumbelina (2009)
Based on Thumbelina by Hans Christian Andersen and alternatively called Barbie Presents: Thumbelina, this 15th film entry stars Barbie as little Thumbelina and her friends working together to save the environment. A magical group of Twillerbees are one with nature and have amazing abilities to help plants and flowers flourish. However, a spoiled girl named Makena, damages Thumbelina's favorite area of wildflowers for sport. On top of that, a construction company also threatens the Twillerbee's land, and only Thumbelina and her friends have the courage to try to stop them.

Barbie and the Three Musketeers (2009)
Based on the 1844 French tale The Three Musketeers by Alexandre Dumas, this 16th film entry and the first to depict the original debut Barbie wordmark logo, stars Barbie as Corinne, a brave girl who longs to become a fighter and protect the French royal family just as her father has. Corinne is disappointed to discover girls are not allowed to be musketeers. Instead, Corinne and three scullery maids, Viveca, Aramina, and Renee all share the same desire to fight as musketeers and defend the royal family. All four are trained in secret by a swordmaster and soon put their talent to work to save Prince Louis, who has a hidden affection for Corrine.

Modern-day Plots (2010–2015)
From late 2010 to late 2014, Mattel replaced the "Mattel Entertainment" on-screen banner with "Barbie Entertainment" to reflect a shift in strategy for the Barbie films which included a clamp-down on classic princess stories/tales and the rise of more modern themes like fashion, music and on plots involving Barbie's family and friends. Majority of the films below were animated by Mainframe Studios under the name Rainmaker Entertainment. Technicolor partnered with Mattel on 2 of the films as did Arc Productions, with the latter rewarded by Mattel after expressing impressions about its animation work on the first non-Barbie-film production; a web series known as Barbie: Life in the Dreamhouse. Mattel would launch its in-house production division called Mattel Playground Productions on 16 October 2013 and absorb the "Mattel Entertainment", "Mattel Studios" and "Barbie EntertainmentSM" name banners, but it wouldn't be in effect in the Barbie films until Barbie and the Secret Door in late 2014.

Barbie in A Mermaid Tale (2010)
This 17th film entry, the first modern film in the series and the last Barbie film under the "Mattel Entertainment" banner stars Barbie as a surfer named Merliah Summers who lives with her adopted grandfather in Malibu, California. Previously believing that she is an ordinary teen, she learns of her true identity during a surfing tournament: she is a mermaid princess of a kingdom called Oceana. With new dolphin and mermaid friends, Merliah tries to save the Oceana kingdom and her mother Calissa. The team of new friends needs to work together to find three magical ocean items in order to save everyone.

Barbie: A Fashion Fairytale (2010)
This 18th film entry and the first film under the "Barbie Entertainment" banner stars Barbie as herself for the second time and first since The Barbie Diaries playing a princess in a film take on "The Princess and the Pea". When Barbie heard pounding noises, she stood up from the fictional bed and screamed, making the director cut the scene. She tried her best to politely question the director's motives of bringing "zombie peas" into the film/movie, which he claims "were trending at the time", but she ended up getting fired by him. Returning to her styling set, she gets a call from Nikki and opened up her laptop to check out what she just told her: her flops at the film she just got fired from. Her friends console her and she gets a second phone call, this time from Ken, at the time her boyfriend, who breaks up with her and hangs up. She told her friends who got baffled and tried to call Ken again, but to no avail. One of her friends named Grace snatched Barbie's phone from her and blocked her from every communication tool/service and suggested she and her friend, Teresa, would get Barbie and her French poodle, Sequin, to travel faraway to re-invigorate herself. Barbie herself thought of visiting her Aunt Millicent at her fashion designer house in Paris. During Barbie's journey to Paris, her friends went to confront Ken, who was recording lines with Raquelle on her phone. Before her friends came, Ken couldn't call Barbie since yesterday but Raquelle eschewed his thought and made a promise to him not to play it in front of the P.A. systems at school for morning announcements. After Grace saw the determination from Ken to get Barbie back, she suggested going to Paris himself to prove his love for her. But he would face numerous detours before getting there, from sitting next to a little boy to driving in a peasant farmer's vehicle with his pig.

Before arriving at Millicent's, Barbie discovers a rival fashion house belonging to Jaqueline, who claims her fashion house is the "finest" in Paris, and Delphine. She meets her aunt and Marie-Alecia or Alice and learns that the fashion house business was sold to a hot-dog salesman and the fashion house will likely shut down if sales don't pick up. With the help of Millicent's assistant, Alice, as well as in-house mythical "flairies", Shimmer, Glimmer and Shyne, they come up with bold creative ideas to save the business. Ken re-affirms his love for Barbie after the Millicent's fashion house receives recognition from the fashion world. Acclaimed fashion critic, Liliana Roxelle, arrives and invites them on a limousine ride to a party at her mansion, which was elevated to a horse carriage ride. The assistant to the director at Barbie's film at the beginning of the film sped out to hand her a new role at the studio that fired her and now wants her back. Barbie verbally considered it but only after the party after which she would gaze at Ken's eyes and the film fades off.

This film also features Ken in his Barbie film debut and the return of Raquelle from "The Barbie Diaries" and Teresa from "Barbie & the Diamond Castle".

Barbie: A Fairy Secret (2011)
This 19th film entry about fairies dwelling in the human world and the power of friendship sees the return of Barbie, Ken and Raquelle, with the latter gaining more screen time than in the previous film.

After Ken is unexpectedly kidnapped by fairies, Barbie soon discovers her stylist friends’ fairy secret, hoping they can know where Ken has been taken. Barbie sets out to find Ken with her rival, Raquelle in a secret fairy world named Gloss Angeles. Along the way, they face challenges and discover fairy magic, but most of all they find the power of friendship.

Barbie: Princess Charm School (2011)
This 20th film entry stars Barbie as a kind and generous young waitress with a pure heart, named Blair Willows, who lives with her adopted mother, Ms. Willows and younger sister, Emily, in the peasant apartment of Gardania. Blair unexpectedly wins the lottery into Princess Charm School, where she is to be trained to become a proper princess or lady royal. After discovering a shocking secret about her past, she tries her best to fit into the prestigious school despite her clumsiness and harsh received criticism. Along she is helped by her friends, Hailey and Isla.

Barbie: A Perfect Christmas (2011)
This 21st film entry and the second/last Barbie Christmas/Holiday film, stars Barbie and her sisters; Skipper, Stacie and Chelsea together in their feature film debut, as they pack up and head to New York City to visit her Aunt Millicent, who she colloquially calls Aunt Mille. Along the journey, unforeseen complications pop up and the sisters find themselves in the festive town of Tannenbaum where their trip takes a musical turn in the picturesque snow-covered mountains.

Barbie in A Mermaid Tale 2 (2012)
This 22nd film entry and the standalone sequel to Barbie in A Mermaid Tale follows the return of Barbie as surfer-mermaid, Merliah Summers, to Australia to compete in a huge surfing competition. While Merliah is away from Oceana, a mermaid with evil intentions named Eris returns to attempt a second time to take over the throne. Merliah and her friends are pushed to the limit as her love for both worlds are challenged. With Eris defeated, Merliah cheers on a local surfing rival, Kylie Morgan, whiles she discovers her magic powers as she surfs through the water. After winning, Kylie went down the winner's podium to share the trophy with Merliah.

Barbie: The Princess & the Popstar (2012)
This 23rd film entry and the first modern Barbie film take of Mark Twain's "The Prince and the Pauper" stars Barbie as the dual role of Princess Victoria Bethany Evangeline Renee, or Tori for short, of the Kingdom of Maribella and a popstar, Keira, the latter performing a concert to commemorate the kingdom's 500th anniversary. As they meet and they discover they have a lot in common including their beautiful looks. The two decided to swap places so discover whether or not the other life would be as easy as they thought it would when it would turn out that it's and they begin to find more value in being the best version of themselves.

This film also stars Barbie sisters; Stacie as Meredith Renee and Chelsea as Trevi Renee.

Barbie in the Pink Shoes (2013)
This 24th film entry and the 4th and final dance film in the series stars Barbie as a ballet dancer Kristyn Farraday who one day gets swept away with her friend, Hayley, to a secret ballet world when she tries on a pair of sparkly pink shoes she . In this new fantasy world, Kristyn learns about an evil Snow Queen and that she must defeat by dancing her favorite ballets, which are the famous ballets of Giselle and Swan Lake.

From this film until Barbie: Video Game Hero, every Barbie film would be originally released on DVD, Blu-ray and digital copies (branded as "Digital HD").

Barbie: Mariposa & the Fairy Princess (2013)
The sequel to Barbie: Mariposa and the second of 2 spin-offs of the Barbie: Fairytopia trilogy which serves as its epilogue, this 25th film entry sees the return of Barbie as the fairy Mariposa being sent by the Queen Marabella as the royal ambassador from Flutterfield to the fairy kingdom of Shimmervale to make peace with the inhabitant Crystal Fairies and the kingdom's ruler, King Regellius and his daughter, Princess Catania. During the film, the two uncover an evil plot by Gwyllion and her pet bat Boris to destroy Shimmervale by turning the crystals into rocks and must rely on their new friendship to save the kingdom and make peace. Unlike the first film and during this sequel, there are hints and flashes of sparks flying whenever Mariposa and Queen Marabella's son, Prince Carlos, meet which would be seen at the final scene of the film by her best friend Willa and Princess Catania and Talayla.

Barbie & Her Sisters in A Pony Tale (2013)
This 26th film entry stars Barbie and her sisters; Skipper, Stacie and Chelsea, as they set off to Switzerland for a summer horseback riding adventure. Barbie finds a one-of-kind horse which she heard from everyone that it is just a myth to bring back home to Malibu. Stacie is out to prove she is an excellent rider, Chelsea wants to ride the big horses and Skipper isn't so thrilled about being outdoors. Skipper however does meet a smart handsome male horse rider who tries to get under her skin but she rather tries to coax the soft side of him instead, which he would easily resist.

Barbie: The Pearl Princess (2014)
This 27th film entry stars Barbie as mermaid named Lumina who has the ability to make pearls come to life by dancing and changing colors. She is raised in a reef by a green-themed mermaid named Scylla.

In a kingdom far away, King Nereus and Queen Lorelei are worried over their missing daughter while the king's cousin, Caligo, wants to install his son, Fergis, to the throne of Seagundia. One day, an invitation to the coronation party of the heir to the throne lands in Lumina's home. Along the journey, she encounters a stone fish and makes a friend out of him despite his frightening antics.

Lumina attends the royal ball and is fitted with a gown. At the ball, evildoers try to gain control of the kingdom. However, Lumina is able to save the kingdom.

This is the final film under the "Barbie Entertainment" banner, as future films in the series would use the production company name Mattel established the previous year.

Barbie and the Secret Door (2014)
This 28th film entry and the first Barbie film under the "Mattel Playground Productions" moniker stars Barbie as princess Alexa. She accidentally finds a secret door after singing in the royal garden. It leads her into magical new realm, which happens to be a kingdom named Zinnia. Alexa encounters a fairy named Nori and a mermaid named Romy. They go try and save the land from the evil Malucia, who is trying to steal all of the kingdom’s magic.

Barbie in Princess Power (2015)
This 29th film entry stars Barbie as a princess named Kara who wants to help out in the community rather than perform her royal duties which she says is "more like boring." Her parents believed that her helping out in the community is prone to "danger and trouble", even adding "good advice" from their royal advisor, Baron Von Ravendale, who secretly wants to rule the kingdom of Windimere himself. He stated that his father lost to the current king, Kristoff, to a rock-paper-scissors game. A potion he was making got spilled by his frog friend into his machine which also trickled down to a caterpillar in a sewer. The caterpillar moved to a branch of a tree and morphed into a cocoon and then a pink butterfly. Whiles Kara was lamenting to her sisters, Madison and Makyla, about the overprotective nature of her parents, her cousin, Corrine, was revelling in becoming a princess. The butterfly moved closer to Corrine who was annoyed and wanted to slap it away with a stick-like tool, but Kara stopped her, causing her to loose balance and fall. Kara helped her to her feet after which the butterfly kissed Kara for a "thanks", which made her feel weird and funny until she became unconscious and slept. When she woke up, she saw her scared kitten and helps her out. That was how she realized the effect of the butterfly kiss. With the help of her sisters she evolved with her power to become a superhero and adopt the name Super Sparkle. Kara flies around saving the day, but her cousin was having none of that. She overheard Madison and Makayla about how Kara got her powers and set out to find the butterfly and get her powers adopting the name Dark Sparkle and rival her for the affection of the people of Windimere. After Baron re-made his pink potion, he drank it so as to get powers and seek to expel the family from the Windimere castle even to the extent of waking up a sleeping volcano to descend on it. Kara and Corrine set aside their jealousy and rivalry to fend off Baron and have him locked up in an indestructible tower chamber, thus saving the kingdom.

Barbie in Rock 'N Royals (2015)
This 30th film entry and the second of 3 modern film takes on Mark Twain's The Prince and the Pauper is an upbeat modern musical film, starring Barbie in a dual role of Princess Courtney and famous rock star, Erika Juno. They both sign up to attend camps, Camp Royalty and Camp Pop. However, due to an unfortunate mix-up in a roll-call, the two girls end up in the opposite camps. While they try to reverse the mistake, the two girls make the most of their unique situation and begin new friendships.

It is the final film/movie entry starring Barbie as a fictional character(s). Future films in the series would later feature Barbie as herself.

End of home video releases (2015–2017)
Since 2015, Mattel began starring Barbie as herself and not another character in the films with different careers like treasure hunting, gymnastics, espionage, space exploration, golf cart driving and programming as well as taking a deep look into Barbie's fictional life to coincide with the debut of the Barbie Vlogger web series on YouTube.

Mattel would retire the Mattel Playground Productions banner in mid-2016 in favor of the then-new banner, Mattel Creations, which it created on 31 March that year, but would only show the Mattel logo in the post-credits montage until Barbie: Video Game Hero in January 2017. On 25 October 2016, Rainmaker Entertainment acquired and merged Frederator Studios and Erzin-Hirsh Entertainment into a then-new holding company known as WOW! Unlimited Media, LLC and rebrand as Rainmaker Studios. Arc Productions animated the other 2 of their 4 rewarded films and was poised to add a 5th to their portfolio, but could only do pre-production on that 5th entry as it would face a payroll glitch from 1 August 2016 until its filing for bankruptcy weeks later. The 5th entry, titled Barbie & Her Sisters in A Puppy Chase, would be brought over to Rainmaker Entertainment for completion.

Barbie & Her Sisters in The Great Puppy Adventure (2015)
This 31st film entry sees the return of Barbie and her sisters, Skipper, Stacie and Chelsea as they head back to their hometown of Willows, Wisconsin, where they find themselves rummaging through their grandma's attic. The group finds a treasure map of their local town and sets out to discover a hidden chest of jewels but finds the real treasure is their friendship.

Barbie: Spy Squad (2016)
This 32nd film entry is about ordinary friends working together to achieve the unexpected, and stars Barbie, Teresa, and new character, Renee, as talented gymnasts who are recruited as undercover agents. With the girls' special skills and teamwork, they track down a jewel thief who is responsible for a long series of robberies and prove they can be great spies.

This is the last Barbie film produced by "Mattel Playground Productions" before its absorption into "Mattel Creations" on 31 March 2016.

Barbie: Star Light Adventure (2016)
This 33rd film entry about a space adventure in a faraway universe is the 5th Barbie film to be given a limited theatrical release in the United States and the first since Barbie: A Fairy Secret. Barbie flies through space on her hoverboard with her furry sidekick, Pupcorn, who would later on transform into a space kitten. One day, the bright stars begin to dim and flicker. To save the stars, Barbie flies to a new planet to unite with a team of heroes on a mission to save the twinkling stars. If Barbie listens to her heart and follows her instincts, she just might be the leader the universe needs.

It is the first Barbie film produced by "Mattel Creations" since its launch on 30 March 2016. It would also prove to be the final full-length animation work of Arc Productions as they would face a payroll glitch on 1 August 2016 and shut down days later. They did however manage to do the pre-production work for the next film entry before its shut down. Later that month, they got acquired by Jam Filled Entertainment and re-open as its Toronto branch but thus left Rainmaker Entertainment as the sole film animation company again.

Barbie & Her Sisters in A Puppy Chase (2016)
This 34th entry about teamwork stars Barbie and her sisters in their 4th feature film together, this time traveling to a tropical paradise in Hawaii for Chelsea's dance competition. The group and their puppies have some free time before the dance and decide to visit a nearby Dancing Horse Festival. When they explore the Horse festival, the girls get separated from their puppies and must find them before the big dance.

Barbie: Video Game Hero (2017)
This 35th entry is the final feature film in the series and the last Barbie film to be originally released on home video formats and broadcast on either Nickelodeon or any other children's television network in the United States. In this film, Barbie gets magically transported into her favorite video game and becomes a roller-skating character with blonde pigtails. She befriends two characters in the game called Bella, who is a roller-skating princess, and Kris. The two girls work together playing level after level to defeat an evil virus trying to manipulate the entire game.

Pre- and post-Dreamhouse Adventures (2017–present) 
From 2017 until date, Mattel took advantage of the rise of streaming media services to revamp the Barbie feature films into streaming television films and have them predominantly released on Netflix in the United States, although they could be picked up by global television networks for telecast. Rainmaker Studios animated only one film after which they made an announcement about rebranding to Mainframe Studios on 16 March 2020 to return to its original "Mainframe" name roots which was last used 13 years ago. Mattel would extend its partnership with Netflix on 21 October 2022, 4 days before the American debut of the franchise's inaugural interactive special, "Barbie: Epic Road Trip", which would also see the pre-2017 film catalogue previously held by Universal made available through the service.

The films below follows the events before and after the streaming TV series, Barbie: Dreamhouse Adventures.

Barbie: Dolphin Magic (2017)
This 36th entry marked the return of Barbie to Netflix since Barbie: Life in the Dreamhouse and would become the preferred destination for newer Barbie content in the U.S. This entry was originally marketed by Mattel as a special and the pilot to the "Dreamhouse Adventures" TV series. Although the film debuted on Netflix in the U.S., Universal did make it available for sale on DVD and digital copies.

At the beginning of this film, gemstone dolphins and a mermaid were swimming across an ocean whiles a boat came passing by. The green dolphin somehow separated itself from the rest and got caught in the net. The mermaid shouted its name as Emerald and vowed to find her. Not far away ashore, Barbie and her sisters settle at a summer resort where they would meet Ken doing his marine biology internship at a research center close by. Little does he know that his marine biologist, Marlo, is after not only the caught green gemstone dolphin, but all of them, as well as the mermaid now named Isla so as to be self-enriched with money. Barbie realized this and has her sisters along with Ken free them from her traps. Barbie even went as far as disguising herself as Isla so she could instead get caught by Marlo and put her in her place. She re-unites with Isla at the end when she tries calling out to her via a necklace she made for Barbie during the film.

Barbie: Princess Adventure (2020)
This 37th entry follows on from the conclusion of the "Dreamhouse Adventures" TV series and stars Barbie as a blogger who gets invited along with her friends by Princess Amelia to the kingdom of Floravia for a cultural exchange program. With Amelia nervous about becoming Queen, she and Barbie devise a plan to switch places. A rival prince tries to unravel their secret as Barbie and Amelia try to make the switch back before Amelia's coronation ceremony. During the film, Trey Reardon relished an opportunity to become

This entry counts as the 7th musical film in the series and the first since Barbie in Rock 'N Royals.

Barbie & Chelsea: The Lost Birthday (2021)
This 38th entry stars Barbie's youngest sister, Chelsea, in a starring role for the first time filmwise/moviewise and second since the Barbie: Dreamtopia web-based franchise.

Barbie and her family get aboard a cruise liner to celebrate Chelsea's 7th birthday, which would be the following day. The liner ship by late night crosses the International Date Line to the west. The bell rings to wake the Roberts sisters up by morning and Chelsea bounces up with joy and that her birthday is here, only for Skipper to check her phone and see that it's not her birthday. Both Stacie and Barbie confirmed it via their phones. Thinking that her birthday got skipped, Chelsea begins to distance herself from her sisters and runs offto the ship's tip-end where a talking parrot swoops in and tell her about a hidden magic jem a nearby jungle island which could solve her problem. Loving the idea of an adventure, she sets off on a quest to find that gem and get her birthday back. She would however have the strength to hold her nerve against the inhabitant animals of the jungle who would see her differently than what she thought and make friends out of them along the journey. Her sisters learned of the possibility of her entering an island, let alone a jungle island, and wondered the worst that could happen to her and set of themselves to re-unite with her.

Barbie: Big City, Big Dreams (2021)
This 39th film entry stars Barbie who leaves her current home of Malibu, California and travel to New York City to join an elite performing arts program where she would meet another Barbie, but from Brooklyn. The two become fast friends and enjoy spending their time singing and exploring The Big Apple and all its splendour. The two find themselves in a competition for the top spot to sing a solo in Times Square, thanks to a strict father-manager who do anything for his daughter to get it instead. They will later discover later that a friendly competition is more about becoming your best and sharing the spotlight.

This entry is the 8th musical film in the series. Following this film is the second full-length streaming TV series in the Barbie media franchise, Barbie: It Takes Two, which exposes the misadventures of the Barbie-named girls in New York City as they invoke attempt after attempt to sign record deals and get their music out to the world whiles learning about each other's families, friends and contrasting cultures.

Barbie: Mermaid Power (2022)
This 40th film entry stars Barbie "Malibu" Roberts, Barbie "Brooklyn" Roberts, Skipper, Stacie, and Chelsea as they turn into mermaids to help Isla (from Dolphin Magic) in the underwater world of Pacifica. The Barbies take part in a competition with 6 other mer-persons to be the power keeper, a mermaid who can protect their world with the power of the four elements (land, water, air and fire). Marlo also returns to continue her journey from where it left off from Dolphin Magic to seek proof that "mermaids are real" with the unsuccessful help of a male sidekick, Oslo.

Barbie: Epic Road Trip (2022)
This 41st and currently the latest film entry stars Barbie going on a cross-country trek with friends in this interactive special and makes big decisions about the future.

On October 21, 2022 (only four days before its official release), Mattel extended its partnership with Netflix and included the pre-2017 film catalogue previously held by Universal on the service.

See also
 Barbie
 Barbie Dreamtopia
 Barbie (media franchise)
 Barbie Dreamhouse Adventures

References

Barbie
Barbie films
Films based on fashion dolls
Films based on Mattel toys
Lists of films by franchise